Leonor da Silveira Moreno e Lemos Gomes (born 28 October 1970) is a Portuguese film actress who made her film debut in The Cannibals for director Manoel de Oliveira in 1988. She appeared in most of Oliveira's subsequent films.

She is the daughter of João José de Azevedo e Lemos Gomes and his wife Maria Ana da Silveira Moreno, and is the older sister of Lourenço da Silveira Moreno de Lemos Gomes.

Selected filmography
 1988 The Cannibals
 1990 No, or the Vain Glory of Command 
 1991 The Divine Comedy 
 1991 No Dia dos Meus Anos (On My Birthday)
 1993 Abraham's Valley 
 1995 The Convent 
 1996 Party 
 1997 Voyage to the Beginning of the World
 1998 Anxiety 
 1999 The Letter 
 2000 Word and Utopia 
 2001 I'm Going Home 
 2001 Porto of My Childhood
 2002 The Uncertainty Principle
 2003 A Talking Picture 
 2005 Magic Mirror
 2006 Belle Toujours 
 2007 Christopher Columbus - The Enigma 
 2009 Eccentricities of a Blonde-haired Girl
 2010 The Strange Case of Angelica 
 2012 Gebo et l'Ombre
 2023 Bad Living
 2023 Living Bad

Accolades
In 2021, she was selected as Jury member for International competition section of 74th Locarno Film Festival held from 4 to 14 August.

References

External links

1970 births
Living people
Portuguese film actresses
Portuguese people of Italian descent
Actresses from Lisbon